Tregamere is a hamlet in the parish of St Columb Major, Cornwall, England, United Kingdom, about 1 km northeast of the town of St Columb Major.

References

Hamlets in Cornwall
St Columb Major